Krapovickasia is a genus of flowering plants in the mallow family Malvaceae, disjunctly distributed in Mexico, Brazil, Paraguay, Uruguay and Argentina. Perennial herbs, they have yellowish to peach or faded rose colored flowers.

Species
Currently accepted species include:
 
Krapovickasia flavescens (Cav.) Fryxell
Krapovickasia macrodon (DC.) Fryxell
Krapovickasia physaloides (C.Presl) Fryxell
Krapovickasia urticifolia (A.St.-Hil.) Fryxell

References

Malvaceae genera
Malveae